Milton Keynes Dons Football Club (usually abbreviated to MK Dons) is  a professional association football club based in Milton Keynes, Buckinghamshire, England, founded in 2004. The club was formed from Wimbledon F.C. after the latter had relocated to Milton Keynes. The club renamed itself as the 'Milton Keynes Dons' but subsequently considers itself to be a new club founded in 2004 (the club badge includes MMIV - Roman Numerals for 2004).

The MK Dons continued in Wimbledon's league place which, after relegation in the previous season, was in the 2004–05 Football League One. After two seasons in the third tier of English football, they were relegated to the fourth tier (League Two). They were promoted in their second League Two season, as champions. Their second spell in League One lasted seven seasons, when in 2015, they finished in second place and therefore moved up to the Football League Championship. However in 2016, they were relegated back down to League One.

As of the end of 2021–22, the club's first team had spent one season in the second tier of English football, fourteen seasons in the third tier and three in the fourth. The table details their achievements in first-team competitions, and records their top goalscorer and average home league attendance, for each completed season since their first appearance under its present name in the Football League in 2004–05.

Key

Key to divisions
Championship = Football League Championship
League One = Football League One/EFL League One
League Two = Football League Two/EFL League Two

Key to positions and symbols
  – Champions
  – Runners-up
  – Promoted
  – Relegated

Key to rounds
Group = Group stage
R1 = First round, etc.
QF = Quarter-finals

 = Winners

Seasons

Notes

References 

Seasons
 
Milton Keynes Dons